Nesidiothrips is a genus of thrips in the family Phlaeothripidae.

Species
 Nesidiothrips alius
 Nesidiothrips validus

References

Phlaeothripidae
Thrips
Thrips genera